Martin Glacier is a glacier,  wide and  long, which flows west and then northwest from the south side of Mount Lupa to the southeast corner of Rymill Bay where it joins Bertrand Ice Piedmont, on the west coast of Graham Land, Antarctica. It was first surveyed in 1936 by the British Graham Land Expedition (BGLE) under John Riddoch Rymill, and was resurveyed in 1948–1949 by the Falkland Islands Dependencies Survey. The glacier was named for James Hamilton Martin, a member of the British Australian and New Zealand Antarctic Research Expedition (1929–1931) under Sir Douglas Mawson, and first mate of the Penola during the BGLE.

See also
 List of glaciers in the Antarctic

References

Glaciers of Fallières Coast